Lima station could refer to:

 Lima (Buenos Aires Underground), a subway station in Buenos Aires, Argentina
 Lima (Milan Metro), a subway station in Milan, Italy
 Lima station (Pennsylvania Railroad), a disused train station in Lima, Ohio